Vyacheslav Ivanovich Bulavin (born 18 April 1946 in Kazan) is a Russian football coach and a former player.

External links
 

1946 births
Footballers from Kazan
Living people
Soviet footballers
FC Rubin Kazan players
FC Zenit Saint Petersburg players
Soviet football managers
FC Zenit Saint Petersburg managers
Russian football managers
Russian expatriate football managers
Expatriate football managers in Estonia
FC TVMK managers
Association football defenders